Events from the year 2001 in South Korea.

Incumbents
 President: Kim Dae-jung 
 Prime Minister: Lee Han-dong

Events
 The Seongnam Central Library opens.
 February: The Korean Metal Workers' Union is founded.
 March 29: Incheon International Airport opens.
 April: First edition of the Tour de Korea.
 September 11: Korean Air Flight 085 hijacking
 November 23: 2001 Mnet Asian Music Awards
 November 25: The National Human Rights Commission of Korea is formed.
 Date unknown:
 Daiwon Digital Broadcasting company is launched.

Sport
 2001 FIFA Confederations Cup
 2001 K League
 2001 Korean FA Cup
 2001 Korean League Cup
 2001 South Korea national football team season

Films
 List of South Korean films of 2001

Birth
 January 1 - Kim Minjeong
 January 29 — Lee Dae-hwi
 January 13 - Kim Haram
 February 5 - Kim Min-ju
 March 13 - Choi Beomgyu
 March 13 - Bae Sumin
 April 17 - Shin Ryujin
 June 4 - Choerry
 June 5 - Lee Chaeryeong
 August 1 - Park Sieun
 October 8 - Huh Yunjin
 October 15 - Lee Heeseung 
 October 22 - Jo Yu-ri
 November 13 - Olivia Hye
 December 4 - Lee Jin-sol
 December 27 - Kyla Massie

See also
 2001 in South Korean music

References

 
South Korea
Years of the 21st century in South Korea
2000s in South Korea
South Korea